Providence Initiative for Psychogeographic Studies (PIPS), sometimes referred to as "People Interested in Participatory Societies," is a small collective of artists in Providence, Rhode Island which promotes artistic and social investigations in psychogeography.  PIPS grew out of a small group looking to investigate the urban environment in detail.

References
Providence Journal May 30, 2006 - That's an acronym for the Providence Initiative for Psychogeographic Studies; although sometimes it stands for People Interested in Participatory Societies
 College HIll Independent April 14, 2005
 Boston Globe April 15, 2005

External links
 PIPS Official site.

Psychogeography
Culture of Providence, Rhode Island